Piao Taoyu (born 18 May 1993) is a Chinese footballer currently playing as a midfielder for Chongqing Liangjiang.

Club career
Piao Taoyu would begin his formal football training in Qingdao before having a spell at Zhejiang Greentown and even going abroad from April 2010 to March 2012 to play in the high school football league for Oisca High School in Hamamatsu City, Shizuoka Prefecture, Japan. Piao would return to his hometown and join second-tier football club Yanbian Baekdu Tigers in the 2013 league season. After a 3–2 defeat to Hunan Billows on 12 April 2013, Piao was dropped from the first team. The club would issue a statement that the reason why he was dropped was because he disrespected a coach by wearing headphones when he was spoken to. The Head coach Cho Keung-yeon would issue similar draconian punishments to several other members of the squad, which resulted in a player strike unless the head coach was sacked. With a new head coach and a return to the senior team to help them avoid relegation, Piao decided to leave the team at the end of the season and went off to train with South Korean side Jeonnam Dragons.

At the beginning of the 2015 league season Piao would join another second-tier club in Harbin Yiteng and follow them as the relocated to Zhejiang and renamed themselves Zhejiang Yiteng. He would make his debut for the club in a league game against Jiangxi Liansheng on 22 March 2015, which ended in a 2–1 victory. This would be followed by his first goal for the club on 13 August 2016 in a league game against Hunan Billows that ended in a 5–1 victory.

Career statistics

References

External links

1993 births
Living people
Chinese footballers
Association football midfielders
China League One players
Chinese Super League players
Yanbian Funde F.C. players
Zhejiang Yiteng F.C. players
Tianjin Jinmen Tiger F.C. players